Alberta Park is a park located in northeast Portland, Oregon. Acquired in 1921, the park includes a basketball court, dog off-leash area, playground, soccer field, softball field and tennis court, as well as paved and unpaved paths and picnic tables. The park is maintained by a volunteer group known as Friends of Alberta Park.

See also

 List of parks in Portland, Oregon

References

External links
 
Trees of Alberta Park

1921 establishments in Oregon
Parks in Portland, Oregon
Protected areas established in 1921
Vernon, Portland, Oregon